Fernand is a masculine given name of French origin. The feminine form is Fernande.

Fernand may refer to:

People

Given name
 Fernand Augereau (1882–1958), French cyclist
 Fernand Auwera (1929–2015), Belgian writer
 Fernand Baldet (1885–1964), French astronomer
 Fernand Berckelaers (1901– 1999), Belgian artist
 Fernand Besnier (1894–1977), French cyclist
 Fernand Boden (born 1943), Luxembourg politician
 Fernand Bouisson (1874–1959), French politician
 Fernand Braudel (1902–1985), French historian
 Fernand Brouez (1861–1900), Belgian publisher
 Fernand Buyle (1918–1992), Belgian footballer
 Fernand Canelle (1882–1951), French footballer
 Fernand Charpin (1887–1944), French actor
 Fernand Collin (1897–1990), Belgian businessman
 Fernand Cormon (1845–1924), French painter
 Fernand Crommelynck (1886–1970), Belgian dramatist
 Fernand David (1869–1935), French Minister of Agriculture
 Fernand Decanali (1925–2017), French cyclist
 Fernand Dubé (1928–1999), Canadian politician
 Fernand de Brinon (1885–1947), French Nazi collaborationist
 Fernand de Langle de Cary (1849–1927), French general
 Fernand Fédronic (born 1964), French figure skater
 Fernand Fonssagrives (1910–2003), French photographer
 Fernand Gambiez (1903–1989), French general
 Fernand Gignac (1934–2006), Canadian singer
 Fernand Gonder (1883–1969), French pole vaulter
 Fernand Goux (1899–2008), at age 108, French World War I veteran
 Fernand Goyvaerts (1938–2004), Belgian footballer
 Fernand Gravey (1905–1970), Belgian-French actor
 Fernand Gregh (1873–1960), French poet and literary critic
 Fernand Guindon (1917–1985), Canadian politician 
 Fernand Halphen (1872–1917), French composer
 Fernand Hautain (1858–1942), Belgian businessman
 Fernand Jaccard (1907–2008), Swiss footballer
 Fernand Khnopff (1858–1921), Belgian painter
 Fernand Leduc (1916–2014), Canadian painter
 Fernand Legros (1931–1983), French art dealer
 Fernand Léger (1881–1955), French artist
 Fernand Melgar (born 1963), Swiss actor
 Fernand Mourlot (1895–1988), French printer
 Fernand Nault (1920–2006), Canadian dancer
 Fernand Ouellet (born 1926), Canadian historian
 Fernand Paillet (1850–1918), French figurine artist and jewelry designer
 Fernand Pelloutier (1867–1901), French anarchist
 Fernand Petiot (1900–1975), bartender who invented the Bloody Mary
 Fernand Point (1897–1955), French chef
 Fernand Rinfret (1883–1939), Canadian politician
 Fernand Robichaud (born 1939), Canadian politician
 Fernand Seguin (1922–1988), Canadian biochemist
 Fernand Sorlot, French editor and publisher
 Fernand St. Germain (1928–2014), American politician
 Fernand Tardy (1919–2017), French politician

Surname
 Jeannot Fernand (born 1961), Malagasy politician

See also
 Ferdinand (disambiguation)
 Ferdinando (disambiguation)
 Fernando

French masculine given names